Lark is the second studio album released by British singer songwriter Linda Lewis. It was recorded at Apple studio for Reprise Records and released in 1972.

The cover was designed by English art director John Kosh with photography by Peter Howe.

Reception

In June 2015 Rolling Stone included Lark on their list of 20 R&B Albums Rolling Stone Loved in the 1970s You Never Heard. They describe it as "an unusual type of soul music: stripped down, accompanying herself on acoustic guitar and piano, casual, "a delight."

In 1973 Rolling Stone critic Vince Aletti wrote "Linda Lewis has this very strange voice. It's like a little girl's: high, with a breathy sort of purity, full of recklessness and wit. But it also has an unexpectedly rough texture which cuts into the little-girl quality so that, while she sounds like no one else, there are moments when she feels like early Stevie Wonder crossed with Michael Jackson — an extraordinary combination.

In April 2015 Gilles Peterson rated Lark at number 77 of his top 100 Albums that every Gilles Peterson fan should have. He described the album as "bold, dramatic and chilling yet smooth, soulful and comforting, this record encompasses the British musician at her best."

Allmusic's Amy Hanson reviewed Lark as "the best of Linda Lewis' early '70s output" and concludes, "the end result is an album that, even today, defines Lewis at her dramatic best – and sounds as fresh to modern ears as it did to Bowie fans back then."

Lewis performed "It's The Frame" and "What Are You Asking Me For" live on BBC Two's The Old Grey Whistle Test in April 1972.

Track samples
Track 2 – "Reach for the Truth" (whole track) was sampled in "Reach Out" by Midfield General (2000).

Track 8 – "Old Smokey" (bridge) was sampled in "Go!" by Common feat. John Mayer and Kanye West (2005).

Track listing 
All tracks composed by Linda Lewis.

Personnel 

All personnel credits adapted from the album's sleeve notes.

Linda Lewis - vocals, guitar, electric piano, guiro, tambourine, wind chimes
Additional musicians

 Jim Cregan – guitars
 Emile Latimer – percussion
 Pat Donaldson – bass
 Phil Chen - bass on "Rock-a-Doodle-Doo"
 Gerry Conway – drums
 Jean Roussel – Piano, electric piano, organ, marimba
 Eric Oxendine – bass
 Poli Palmer – vibes, marimba, flute
 Paul Williams – guitar
 Michael Eve – saxophone
Production

 Engineer – Phil McDonald
 Engineer (2nd) – John Barrett
 Engineer (Cutting) – Malcolm Davies
 Executive producer – Tony Gourvish
 Producer – Linda Lewis, Jim Cregan
 Written by – Linda Lewis

References

External links
 Lark at Last.fm
 Lark at Discogs
 Linda Lewis at MTV
 Linda Lewis at BBC

1972 albums
Reprise Records albums
Linda Lewis albums